Cheveldayoff is a surname. Notable people with the surname include:

Ken Cheveldayoff (born 1965), Canadian politician
Kevin Cheveldayoff (born 1970), Canadian ice hockey defenceman, brother of Ken